Senator Rummel may refer to:

Jacob Rummel (1857–1928), Wisconsin State Senate
Sandy Rummel (born 1942), Minnesota State Senate